Aymar is both a surname and a given name. Notable people with the name include:

Surname:
Luciana Aymar (born 1977), Argentine field hockey midfielder
Marcel Aymar, Franco-Ontarian musician, composer, writer and actor
Robert Aymar, Director General of CERN (2004–2008)
Tim Aymar, American heavy metal singer/songwriter who resides in Florida
Chevalier d'Aymar, a French Navy officer who served during the War of American Independence

Given name:
Aymar Chaste (died 1603), Catholic, French admiral during the Franco-Spanish Wars
Aymar Embury II (1880–1966), American architect

See also
Aymara language